Ashtian (also Romanized as Āshtīān and Ashtīyan) is a city and capital of Ashtian County, Markazi Province, Iran.  At the 2006 census, its population was 8,324, in 2,597 families.

Ashtian lies in a fertile agricultural district, watered by surface streams and qanats. The region, which traditionally belonged to Tafresh County is a famous one for carpet-weaving. Among its historical monuments is the remains of a fortress and a Safavid era caravanserai. In the past, a large number of Iranian courtiers and calligraphers were from the Tafresh and Ashtian regions. Several learned men and religious figures have stemmed from Ashtian. The Mostowfi family of Ashtian occupied several roles within the Qajar and Pahlavi administrative system. Abbās Eqbāl Āshtiyāni, a celebrated Iranian literary figure, and Abdolkarim Gharib, founder of geological research in Iran, were born in Ashtian. Father of Dr Mohammad Gharib, founder of modern Paediatrics in Iran, was also a native of Ashtian.

The people of Ashtian speak a peculiar Persian dialect known as Ashtiani. They follow the Shia branch of Islam.

See also

 Ashtiyani dialect

References

External links
 "Ashtian" in Encyclopedia Iranica by C.E. Bosworth
 "Ashtiyani, the dialect of Ashtiyan" in Encyclopedia Iranica by E. Yarshater

Populated places in Ashtian County

Cities in Markazi Province